Sinutor incertus is a species of sea snail, a marine gastropod mollusk, in the family Calliostomatidae within the superfamily Trochoidea, the top snails, turban snails and their allies.

Description
The height of the shell attains 12 mm.

Distribution and habitat
This marine species occurs off both eastern and western Australia, and Tasmania, at depths of 270 m.

References

Calliostomatidae
Gastropods described in 1863